Oxypetalum coeruleum is a species of flowering plant, native to South America from southern Brazil to Uruguay. The synonymous name Tweedia caerulea is also used. It is grown for its clear pale blue, star-shaped flowers, which are long lasting and cut well. The seeds have downy parachute-like tufts (cypsela).

The cultivar 'Alba' has white flowers, while 'Rosea' has pink flowers.

Oxypetalum  coeruleum requires full sun in a well-drained soil that is dry. Propagation is via seed. Alternatively it can be grown as an annual.

This plant has gained the Royal Horticultural Society's Award of Garden Merit.

References

Asclepiadoideae
Flora of South America
Garden plants